Glacidorbis occidentalis is a species of minute freshwater snails with an operculum, aquatic gastropod molluscs or micromolluscs in the family Glacidorbidae. This species is endemic to Australia.

This species was previously placed within the Hydrobiidae.

References

Glacidorbidae
Vulnerable fauna of Australia
Gastropods described in 1983
Taxonomy articles created by Polbot